Born Into Exile is a 1997 television film directed by Eric Laneuville. It featured Seann William Scott in his film debut.

Plot
Holly Nolan is a 14-year-old, dealing with the typical issues of someone her age, including peer pressure. Always wanting to hang out with the older crowd, she meets and falls in love with Chris, a 19-year-old guy who was rejected by his family. He is now hoping to attend college and go into forestry once he is out of the military reserve force. When her recently divorced and overly protective mother, Donna, finds out about their relationship, she is outraged, forbidding her from ever seeing him again. Holly, upset that her mother doesn't want to give him a chance because of his age, responds furiously when she kicks him out of her yard. She sneaks out and decides to run away with him to start a new life in California.

They soon find out that traveling without money is difficult. This fact only is emphasized further when they encounter a lecherous trucker and a change of routes. They break the law by stealing to survive. Once in Southern California, they soon find out they have nowhere to go. They pass up an offer from the church, but discover they can't count on support from their families either. Chris is wanted because of his desertion, and Donna files a missing persons report with the police to find her daughter, threatening to sue Chris for statutory rape. Thinking she is in love with him, Holly decides to ignore her mother and stay with Chris. However, this proves to be exhausting. Holly is arrested for suspicion prostitution and Chris eventually turns to male prostitution on the streets of Los Angeles to earn money for food.

Cast
Mark-Paul Gosselaar as Chris
Gina Philips as Holly Nolan
Talia Shire as Donna Nolan
Eddie Mills as Ted Nolan
Seann William Scott as Derek
Heather Gottlieb as Rosie
Mark Pellegrino as Walter
Ever Carradine as Hooker

Production and reception
The story was written to confront people about the then huge amount of teenage runaways. It was initially to be an ABC Afterschool Special and received support from music bands, claiming it could have positive influence. The project was then shelved, until it was picked up a year later as an NBC made-for-television film.

The film received generally positive reviews. Variety was exceptionally positive about the film, praising the story, the characters, the cinematography and Talia Shire's acting performance. The New York Times was less praiseful, criticizing the way the story was told, stating it was not sordidly. However, the newspaper praised the director and musical score.

References

External links

Profile on MyLifetime

1997 television films
1997 films
American teen drama films
Films directed by Eric Laneuville
NBC network original films
American drama television films
1990s American films